Kidagalegama Hethuhamige Nandasena (born 20 September 1954) is a Sri Lankan politician, former provincial minister and Member of Parliament.

Nandasena was born on 20 September 1954. He was a member of Padaviya Divisional Council and North Central Provincial Council where he held a provincial ministerial portfolio. He was dismissed from his ministerial position in May 2017 after attending a Joint Opposition May Day rally. He contested the 2020 parliamentary election as a Sri Lanka People's Freedom Alliance electoral alliance candidate in Anuradhapura District and was elected to the Parliament of Sri Lanka.

References

1954 births
Health ministers of Sri Lankan provinces
Local authority councillors of Sri Lanka
Living people
Members of the 16th Parliament of Sri Lanka
Members of the North Central Province Board of Ministers
People's Alliance (Sri Lanka) politicians
Sinhalese politicians
Sri Lankan Buddhists
Sri Lanka People's Freedom Alliance politicians
Sri Lanka Podujana Peramuna politicians
United People's Freedom Alliance politicians